Edward Everts Browne (February 16, 1868November 23, 1945) was an American lawyer and Republican politician from Waupaca County, Wisconsin.  He represented Wisconsin's 8th congressional district in the United States House of Representatives for nine terms (1913–1931).

Bigoraphy

Born in Waupaca, Wisconsin, Browne attended the public schools and Waupaca High School.  He graduated from the University of Wisconsin–Madison in 1890 and from the law department of the same university in 1892.

He was admitted to the bar in 1892 and commenced practice in Waupaca, Wisconsin. 
He served as district attorney of Waupaca County 1898–1905.
He served as delegate to the Republican State conventions in 1902, 1904, and 1906.
He served as member of the board of regents of the University of Wisconsin–Madison in 1905 and 1906.
He served as member of the Wisconsin State Senate 1907–1912.

Browne was elected as a Republican to the Sixty-third and to the eight succeeding Congresses (March 4, 1913 – March 3, 1931).
He represented Wisconsin's 8th congressional district. On April 5, 1917, he was one of the 50 representatives who voted against declaring war on Germany.
He was an unsuccessful candidate for renomination in 1930.
He resumed the practice of law.
He served as member of the State conservation commission 1936–1941.
He died in Evanston, Illinois, November 23, 1945.
He was interred in Lakeside Cemetery, Waupaca, Wisconsin.

His father, Edward L. Browne, had been a member of the Wisconsin State Senate and his uncle, Charles E. Browne, was a member of the legislature of the Wisconsin Territory.

Sources

References

1868 births
1945 deaths
People from Waupaca, Wisconsin
Republican Party Wisconsin state senators
Wisconsin lawyers
University of Wisconsin–Madison alumni
University of Wisconsin Law School alumni
Republican Party members of the United States House of Representatives from Wisconsin